Murder Calls Australia is an Australian true-crime series that first screened on the Nine Network on 15 February 2017 hosted by Leila McKinnon. This series reveals murder cases which were solved through crucial phone calls which put the killers behind bars. It features calls from witnesses, the public, the perpetrators, even victims beyond the grave.

Episodes

See also
 List of Australian television series
 Crime Investigation Australia
 Murder Uncovered
 Crime in Australia

References

External links

Nine Network original programming
Australian non-fiction television series
2010s Australian crime television series
2017 Australian television series debuts
Television series by Screentime
2017 Australian television series endings